Calcutta Girls' High School (abbreviated as CGHS) is a private school for girls in Kolkata, West Bengal, India.

History
It was founded in 1856 as a boarding school under the patronage of Lord Canning. The Methodist Church in India now manages the school. The school teaches in the English language, and teaches for the Indian School Certificate Examination (ICSE /  ISC).

See also
Education in India
List of schools in India
Education in West Bengal

References

External links
 

 Methodist schools in India
 Christian schools in West Bengal
 High schools and secondary schools in Kolkata
 Girls' schools in Kolkata
 Educational institutions established in 1856
 1856 establishments in India